Knockarevan is a townland in County Fermanagh, Northern Ireland. 

The highest temperature in Northern Ireland recorded by the Met Office, was previously at Knockarevan in County Fermanagh on 30 June 1976.

See also 
 List of townlands in County Fermanagh

References 

Townlands of County Fermanagh